1,2-Diphenyl-1,2-ethylenediamine, DPEN, is an organic compound with the formula H2NCHPhCHPhNH2, where Ph is phenyl (C6H5). DPEN exists as three stereoisomers: meso and two enantiomers S,S- and R,R-. The chiral diastereomers are used in asymmetric hydrogenation. Both diastereomers are bidentate ligands.

Preparation and optical resolution
1,2-Diphenyl-1,2-ethylenediamine can be prepared from benzil by reductive amination.
DPEN can be obtained as both the chiral and meso diastereomers, depending on the relative stereochemistry of the two CHPhNH2 subunits. The chiral diastereomer, which is of greater value, can be resolved into the R,R- and S,S- enantiomers using tartaric acid as the resolving agent. In methanol, the R,R enantiomer has a specific rotation of [α]23 +106±1°.

Asymmetric catalysis
N-tosylated derivative, TsDPEN, is a ligand precursor for catalysts for asymmetric transfer hydrogenation. For example, (cymene)Ru(S,S-TsDPEN) catalyzes the hydrogenation of benzil into (R,R)-hydrobenzoin. In this reaction, formate serves as the source of H2:
PhC(O)C(O)Ph + 2 H2 → PhCH(OH)CH(OH)Ph (R,R isomer)
This transformation is an example of desymmetrization, the symmetric molecule benzil is converted to the dissymmetric product.

DPEN is a key ingredients of Ryōji Noyori's 2nd generation ruthenium-based chiral hydration catalyst, for which he earned the Nobel Prize in Chemistry in 2001.

References

Diamines
Chelating agents
Phenyl compounds